Jeffrey A. McLean (born October 6, 1969) is a Canadian former professional ice hockey centre who played six games in the National Hockey League (NHL) with the San Jose Sharks during the 1993–94 season. The rest of his career, which lasted from 1992 to 2000, was spent in various minor leagues.

Early life 
McLean was born in Vancouver, British Columbia. He played junior in the BCHL, then moved on to the University of North Dakota.

Career 
After university, McLean turned pro with the Kansas City Blades in 1992. In 1992–93, McLean made his NHL debut, playing six games with the San Jose Sharks. McLean returned to the minor leagues and did not play in the NHL again. McLean played until the 1999–2000 season.

Career statistics

Regular season and playoffs

External links
 

1969 births
Living people
Canadian expatriate ice hockey players in Germany
Canadian ice hockey centres
Cincinnati Cyclones (IHL) players
Fort Wayne Komets players
Kansas City Blades players
Kalamazoo Wings (1974–2000) players
Kassel Huskies players
Langley Eagles players
National Hockey League supplemental draft picks
North Dakota Fighting Hawks men's ice hockey players
Quebec Citadelles players
Richmond Sockeyes players
San Jose Sharks draft picks
San Jose Sharks players
South Carolina Stingrays players
Ice hockey people from Vancouver
Tallahassee Tiger Sharks players